The , also known as , is a phenomenon that has been occurring yearly for more than a century in Yoro, Honduras, in which fish are said to fall from the sky. It occurs up to four times in a year.  It has attracted the attention of scientists, as well as documentary coverage by the History Channel in the United States.

Festival
Beginning in 1998, locals of the department of Yoro, Honduras have held an annual Festival de Lluvia de Peces to celebrate the phenomenon. The date of the festival is variable, coinciding with the first major rainfall in May or June. The festival includes a parade and carnival.

Possible explanations

Natural
The explanation generally offered for the rain of fish is meteorological, often speculated to be strong winds or waterspouts, as is commonly proposed when attempting to explain similar occurrences of raining animals.

Alternatively, the fish may have originated in fresh water and moved from a nearby river into a subterranean water current or cave system in response to seasonal changes. Subsequent heavy rains wash the fish up out of this habitat and the water recedes to leave the fish stranded.

Father Subirana miracle
Spanish priest Father José Manuel de Jesús Subirana was a figure in the history of Christianity in Honduras. He arrived in Honduras in 1855 and worked there until his death in 1864. Today the name of Father Subirana is linked with the legend of the Yoro fish rain. The legend goes as follows: "Father Subirana saw how poor the people of Honduras were and prayed three days and three nights asking God for a miracle to help the poor people and to provide them with food. After these three days and nights, God took note of this and there came a dark cloud. Many tasty fish fell from the sky, feeding all the people. Since then this wonder is repeated every year."

See also
Raining animals

References 

 Honduras: Así fue la 'Lluvia de Peces' en Victoria, Yoro La Prensa (Honduras), 2014-05-22. (In Spanish).
  Town where Fish Rain from the Sky (YouTube), 2022-12-20. (In English, plus some Spanish with English subtitles).

Further reading 
 Rafael Heliodoro Valle, Lluvia de peces en Yoro, Departamento Editorial de la Dirección General de Cultura, Secretaría de Cultura y Turismo de Honduras, 1980

Folk festivals in Honduras
Honduran folklore
Yoro Department
Anomalous weather